The 2020–21 Big Ten men's ice hockey season was the 31st season of play for the Big Ten Conference's men's ice hockey division and took place during the 2020–21 NCAA Division I men's ice hockey season. The start to the regular season was delayed until November 13, 2020 and concluded on March 6, 2021. The conference tournament was held at the Compton Family Ice Arena in Notre Dame, Indiana.

Season
Due to the ongoing COVID-19 pandemic, the Big Ten season did not begin until mid-November, 6 weeks later than usual. As a result of the pandemic, the Big Ten only scheduled conference opponents during the regular season with one exception. Arizona State, an independent program, entered into a scheduling alliance with the Big Ten for this season. The team agreed to play its entire season on the road and would not be eligible for the Big Ten tournament.

The regular season was highlighted by the prominence of Minnesota for most of the year and the scoring exploits of Cole Caufield. Caufield averaged a goal per game pace for the year and led both the Big Ten and the nation in both goals and points. The conference was able to earn 3 at-large bids for member schools, resulting in more than half of the Big Ten making the NCAA tournament. Unfortunately, while the conference was able to avoid too much trouble from COVID during the regular season, both Michigan and Notre Dame had players test positive just before their regional semifinal games and were forced to withdraw. As a result, their matchup with Boston College was ruled a no-contest and the Eagles automatically advanced to the Northeast Regional final. Similarly, on March 26, the NCAA announced Michigan was forced to withdraw as well due to COVID protocols. Minnesota provided the conference with its only tournament victory, defeating Omaha 7–2 before losing in the quarterfinals to in-state rival Minnesota State. 

After the season, Michigan made national headlines by having 3 players be drafted in the first five selections of the 2021 NHL Entry Draft. The Wolverines had an incoming freshman taken 4th overall as well.

Standings

Coaches

Records

Statistics

Leading scorers
GP = Games played; G = Goals; A = Assists; Pts = Points; PIM = Penalty minutes

Leading goaltenders
Minimum 1/3 of team's minutes played in conference games.

GP = Games played; Min = Minutes played; W = Wins; L = Losses; T = Ties; GA = Goals against; SO = Shutouts; SV% = Save percentage; GAA = Goals against average

Conference tournament

Note: * denotes overtime periods.

NCAA tournament

Regional semifinal

East

West

Regional final

West

Ranking

USCHO

USCHO did not release a poll in week 20.

USA Today

Awards

NCAA

Big Ten

Conference tournament

2021 NHL Entry Draft

† incoming freshman

References

External links
official website

2020–21 Big Ten men's ice hockey season
Big Ten
2020–21